Albert Alavedra Jiménez (born 26 February 1999) is an Andorran footballer who plays as a centre-back for CF Badalona and the Andorra national team.

Early life
Alavedra was born in Castellbell i el Vilar, near Manresa to an Andorran mother.

International career
Alavedra made his international debut for Andorra on 13 October 2020 in the UEFA Nations League against the Faroe Islands.

Career statistics

International

References

External links
 
 
 

1999 births
Living people
People with acquired Andorran citizenship
Andorran footballers
Association football central defenders
Andorra youth international footballers
Andorra under-21 international footballers
Andorra international footballers
Andorran people of Spanish descent
People from Bages
Sportspeople from the Province of Barcelona
Footballers from Catalonia
Spanish footballers
UD Logroñés B players
Algeciras CF footballers
CE Manresa players
Cerdanyola del Vallès FC players
CD Calahorra players
Tercera División players
Spanish people of Andorran descent